Cormac Ó Luimlín, Bishop of Clonfert, died 19 June 1259.

This bishop bore the same surname as Cormac Ua Lumluini, lector of Cluain-fearta-Brenainn, the remnant of the sages of Ireland in his time, who, according to the Annals of the Four Masters, died in 1170.

See also
Catholic Church in Ireland

References
 Annals of the Four Masters
 The Tribes and Customs of Hy-Many, commonly called O'Kelly's Country
 The Surnames of Ireland, Edward MacLysaght, 1978.
 A New History of Ireland: Volume IX - Maps, Genealogies, Lists, ed. T.W. Moody, F.X. Martin, F.J. Byrne.

People from County Galway
Medieval Gaels from Ireland
13th-century Roman Catholic bishops in Ireland
Bishops of Clonfert
1259 deaths